In enzymology, an aspartate—ammonia ligase is an enzyme that catalyzes the chemical reaction

ATP + L-aspartate + NH3  AMP + diphosphate + L-asparagine

The 3 substrates of this enzyme are ATP, L-aspartate, and NH3, whereas its 3 products are AMP, diphosphate, and L-asparagine.

This enzyme belongs to the family of ligases, specifically those forming carbon-nitrogen bonds as acid-D-ammonia (or amine) ligases (amide synthases).  The systematic name of this enzyme class is L-aspartate:ammonia ligase (AMP-forming). Other names in common use include asparagine synthetase, and L-asparagine synthetase.  This enzyme participates in 3 metabolic pathways: alanine and aspartate metabolism, cyanoamino acid metabolism, and nitrogen metabolism.

Structural studies

References

 
 

EC 6.3.1
Enzymes of known structure